Lotfi Turki (born 6 March 1975) is a Tunisian middle-distance runner. He competed in the men's 3000 metres steeplechase at the 2000 Summer Olympics.

References

External links
 

1975 births
Living people
Athletes (track and field) at the 2000 Summer Olympics
Tunisian male middle-distance runners
Tunisian male steeplechase runners
Olympic athletes of Tunisia
Place of birth missing (living people)